Nupserha vanrooni is a species of beetle in the family Cerambycidae. It was described by Per Olof Christopher Aurivillius in 1916. It is known from Tanzania and Malawi.

Varietas
 Nupserha vanrooni var. fuscomaculata Breuning, 1958
 Nupserha vanrooni var. holoflavipennis Breuning, 1958
 Nupserha vanrooni var. medionigripennis Breuning, 1958
 Nupserha vanrooni var. quadrisignata Breuning, 1958
 Nupserha vanrooni var. sexsignata Breuning, 1958
 Nupserha vanrooni var. usambarica Breuning, 1958

References

vanrooni
Beetles described in 1916